Tebuthiuron is a nonselective broad spectrum herbicide of the urea class.  It is used in a number of herbicides manufactured by Dow AgroSciences, and is sold under several trade names, depending on the formulation.  It is used to control weeds, woody and herbaceous plants, and sugar cane. It is absorbed by the roots and transported to the leaves, where it inhibits photosynthesis.

The Environmental Protection Agency considers tebuthiuron to have a great potential for groundwater contamination, due to its high water solubility, low adsorption to soil particles, and high persistence in soil (its soil half-life is 360 days).

In Europe, tebuthiuron has been banned since November 2002.  

In 2010, tebuthiuron was deliberately used in an act of vandalism to poison the live oak trees at Toomer's Corner on the Auburn University campus following the 2010 Iron Bowl.

References

External links
Dow AgroSciences MSDS on Spike 80DF

Herbicides
Thiadiazoles
Ureas
Tert-butyl compounds